(born February 2, 1930) is a Japanese diplomat. He was appointed as Japanese ambassador to the Philippines in 1988. After his retirement, he helped run the humanitarian organization, Global Voluntary Service, and received a Presidential Citation from Philippine President Gloria Macapagal Arroyo on February 15, 2010.  In 2013 President Benigno S. Aquino III of Philippines awarded him with the Order of the Golden Heart with the Grand Cross rank in Malacanang's Palace for "his role in establishing numerous health, education and livelihood projects for Filipinos".

References

Living people
Ambassadors of Japan to the Philippines
1930 births